Silence of the Heart is a 1984 American made-for-television drama film starring Charlie Sheen, Chad Lowe, Mariette Hartley, Dana Hill, Howard Hesseman and Silvana Gallardo, directed by Richard Michaels and written by Phil Penningroth.

The film was considered groundbreaking for the time period and heralded a coming trend of films that dealt with teenage suicide, a topic previously not discussed in family film, with an emphasis on the surviving family of a teenager who commits suicide.

Plot 
Skip Lewis (Chad Lowe) is a 17-year-old boy who has been having academic problems. A girl named Andrea, whom he has been pursuing, has told him that she has no interest in him. He tries to talk to his parents (Mariette Hartley & Howard Hesseman) about this but can't bring himself to, thinking that they won't understand. He commits suicide by driving his car over a cliff onto rocks. Now, his parents are in denial saying that his death was an accident. However, his best friend, Ken Cruze (Charlie Sheen) who was the last person he saw before his death, was told by Skip that he was considering killing himself and is feeling guilty that he didn't try to stop him.  Skip's sister Cindy (Dana Hill) tries to bring her family out of denial so they can heal.

Partial cast
 Charlie Sheen as Ken Cruze (his first acting role)
 Mariette Hartley as Barbara Lewis
 Dana Hill as Cindy Lewis
 Howard Hesseman as Carl Lewis
 Chad Lowe as Skip Lewis
 Silvana Gallardo as Alice Roberti
 Elizabeth Berridge as   Penny
 Alexandra Powers as Andrea
 Ray Girardin as Harris
 Sherilyn Fenn as Monica
 Melissa Hayden as Rachel
 Casey Siemaszko as Jeff
 Jeffrey Lampert as Mr. Bonaducci 
 Steve Eastin as Ed Rintal
 Leslie Bega as Cindy
 Rick Fitts as Dan Norlan
 Lynette Mettey as Marilyn Cruze
 Jaleel White as Hanry
 David L. Crowley as Mourner (as David Crowley)

Critical reception
The New York Times wrote "In any television project of this sort, the dramatization elements tend to be shaped by requirements usually associated with a how-to manual. This is the problem, we are told, and this is the way to cope with it. Experts are recruited. (Silence of the Heart lists Charlotte Ross, director of the Suicide Prevention and Crisis Center of California's San Mateo County, as technical adviser.) Not infrequently, dramatic clout gets lost in the authenticity shuffle.
Fortunately, this is not the case with Silence of the Heart, a David A. Simons Production made in association with Tisch/Avnet Productions. Steve Tisch and Jon Avnet, the executive producers, have been steadily compiling an impressive television record since the release of their film Risky Business and this production gives them still another solid credit. Phil Penningroth's script and Richard Michaels's direction are effectively restrained, avoiding unnecessary melodrama. (The use of a volume of Sylvia Plath's poetry is a trifle pat bud not entirely out of order.)"

References

External links 
 

1984 television films
1984 films
1980s teen drama films
American teen drama films
Films about suicide
CBS network films
Films scored by Georges Delerue
Films directed by Richard Michaels
1980s English-language films
1980s American films